Arsiko-Makhamaz-ogly, Arsiko-Muhamad ogly, Arsiko Mohammad ogly — Kistin naib of Imam Shamil who governed the district of mountainous Chechnya of North Caucasian Imamate during the Caucasian War. Arsiko was also referred as Kistin Naib ("Кистинский Наиб"). According to historian Dadaev, he was among the brave and faithful naibs of Shamil alongside Muhammad-Mirza Anzorov and others.

Origins 
Dadaev and the Chechen historian Khozhaev gives a theory that there's a possibility of Arsiko and naib of Dishni — Arsanuko Arsanukaev being one person. Which would make the naib Chechen.

References

Bibliography 
 
 

 
Naibs of Imam Shamil